Trilogy is a 2013 live album by Chick Corea and his trio, featuring Corea on piano with  Christian McBride on double bass and Brian Blade on drums. The three-disc album was recorded live in Washington, D.C. and Oakland, California, and in Spain, Switzerland, Austria, Slovenia, Turkey, and Japan. In the Billboard Jazz albums charts 2014 the album peaked number 9. It won the 2014 Grammy Award for Best Jazz Instrumental Album.

A follow up of this album, entitled Trilogy 2, was issued in 2018 with the same personnel.

Critical reception 

John Kelman of All About Jazz summarizes his review with the statement: "It's hard to believe that Corea is now 73 years old but, if anything, he's never been more active—and, with albums as superb as Trilogy, in the company of the equally outstanding McBride and Blade, clearly at the top of his game."

Steve Leggett wrote in his AllMusic review: "This expansive live release finds Corea working with bassist Christian McBride and drummer Brian Blade, and the three have an uncanny connection, filling space with gorgeous and subtle phrasings, gliding through all manner of styles with a seemingly effortless elegance, grace, and freshness." and concludes "Not exactly a holding pattern, and not exactly a career summation, Trilogy will surely please and delight Corea's many fans."

John Fordham of the Guardian wrote: "Chick Corea, now 73, has shown that his curiosity as well as his playing remain undimmed with genre-bending recent ventures such as his Vigil group. But plenty of Corea fans want nothing more than for him to cut loose with a classic acoustic-jazz trio, and that’s precisely the deal for this three-CD set, recorded live around the world between 2010 and 2012.(..) For Corea admirers, and jazz-piano fans of all kinds, it’s a must."

Track listing 
Disc one
 "You're My Everything" (Mort Dixon, Harry Warren, Joseph Young) – 12:00
 "Recorda Me" (Joe Henderson) – 7:29
 "The Song Is You" (Oscar Hammerstein II, Jerome Kern) – 13:55
 "Work" (Thelonious Monk) – 5:14
 "My Foolish Heart" (Ned Washington, Victor Young) – 9:20
 "Fingerprints" (Chick Corea) – 10:22
 "Spain" (Corea) – 18:29

Disc two
 "This Is New" (Ira Gershwin, Kurt Weill) – 12:42
 "Alice in Wonderland" (Sammy Fain, Bob Hilliard)– 9:04
 "It Could Happen to You" (Johnny Burke, Jimmy Van Heusen)– 12:00
 "Blue Monk" (Monk) – 10:01
 "Armando's Rhumba" (Corea) – 9:13
 "Op. 11, No. 9" (Alexander Scriabin)– 10:43
 "How Deep Is the Ocean?" (Irving Berlin)– 13:48 	

Disc three
 "Homage" (Corea) – 10:02
 "Piano Sonata: The Moon" (Corea) – 29:58
 "Someday My Prince Will Come" (Frank Churchill, Larry Morey) – 10:22

Personnel 
 Chick Corea– piano
 Christian McBride – double bass
 Brian Blade – drums

Guest musicians
 Jorge Pardo – flute on "My Foolish Heart" and "Spain"
 Niño Josele – guitar on "My Foolish Heart" and "Spain"
 Gayle Moran Corea – vocals on "Someday My Prince Will Come"

Charts

References

External links 
 Chick Corea Trio - Trilogy (2013) album review by Steve Leggett, credits & releases at AllMusic
 Chick Corea Trio - Trilogy (2013) album releases & credits at Discogs
 Chick Corea Trio - Trilogy (2013) album to be listened as stream on Spotify

2013 live albums
Chick Corea live albums
Concord Records live albums
Grammy Award for Best Jazz Instrumental Album